Terraform is an open-source infrastructure-as-code software tool created by HashiCorp. Users define and provide data center infrastructure using a declarative configuration language known as HashiCorp Configuration Language (HCL), or optionally JSON.

Design 
Terraform manages external resources (such as public cloud infrastructure, private cloud infrastructure, network appliances, software as a service, and platform as a service) with "providers".  HashiCorp maintains an extensive list of official providers, and can also integrate with community-developed providers. Users can interact with Terraform providers by declaring resources or by calling data sources.  Rather than using imperative commands to provision resources, Terraform uses declarative configuration to describe the desired final state.  Once a user invokes Terraform on a given resource, Terraform will perform CRUD actions on the user's behalf to accomplish the desired state.  The infrastructure as code can be written as modules, promoting reusability and maintainability.

Terraform supports a number of cloud infrastructure providers such as Amazon Web Services, Cloudflare, Microsoft Azure, IBM Cloud, Serverspace, Google Cloud Platform, DigitalOcean, Oracle Cloud Infrastructure, Yandex.Cloud, VMware vSphere, and OpenStack.

HashiCorp maintains a Terraform Module Registry, launched in 2017. In 2019, Terraform introduced the paid version called Terraform Enterprise for larger organizations.

Core concepts

Providers 
Terraform relies on providers to enable interaction with various APIs and services. These providers are configured in the Terraform configuration code and allow access to Cloud-based offerings, such as AWS or GCP, and Software-as-a-Service offerings. This allows developers using Terraform to integrate multiple services into their automation workflows.

Modules 
Terraform modules are designed to simplify the creation of multiple resources by grouping them logically in a single and reusable offering. This minimizes development time and reduces redundancy, making it easier for users to create complex infrastructure components without writing large amounts of code.

See also 

 Comparison of open-source configuration management software

References

External links 
 
 

Cross-platform software
Cloud infrastructure
Free software for cloud computing
Systems engineering
Orchestration software
Free software programmed in Go
Software using the Mozilla license